The First Christmas: The Story of the First Christmas Snow is a 1975 Christmas stop motion animated television special produced by Rankin/Bass Productions which originally premiered on NBC on December 19, 1975. It is narrated by Angela Lansbury and co-stars Cyril Ritchard.

Plot
A few weeks before Christmas, a young shepherd named Lucas is struck by lightning while wandering the countryside with his animals, a herd of sheep and a dog named Waggles. A group of kindly nuns named Sister Theresa (the narrator), Sister Jean, and Sister Catherine rescue him, taking him to their abbey nearby. Soon, they and the priest, Father Thomas, learn that he has not only been blinded by the accident, but he is an orphan too. Father Thomas is slightly irritated, but nevertheless, Lucas is allowed to stay at the abbey while he recovers from the accident, and Sister Theresa becomes a mentor to him. She tells him about snow, something neither he nor anyone else at the abbey has ever seen (the village is "much too close to the sea"). He is fascinated and begins to dream of a "white Christmas".

Later on, Father Thomas tells Sister Theresa of his plans to send Lucas to an orphanage after Christmas. Lucas overhears this and is heartbroken. In the meantime, he gets to play an angel in the abbey's Christmas pageant with some other children from the village. There, he meets a girl named Louisa, another one of the angels who immediately befriends him and has a secret crush on her. He shares his dream of seeing snow for the first time with her.

On Christmas Eve, Lucas realizes that he won't be able to take his sheep and Waggles to the orphanage with him after Christmas. He tells Waggles that he has decided to give them to Sister Theresa as a Christmas present. At the same time, three mischievous boys who are in the pageant with him have been eavesdropping on him and decide to lock the sheep in a shed as a prank. Shortly afterward, though, they get out and run into the wolf-ridden forest nearby, and Lucas sets out to find them. The boys admit to Sister Theresa what they have done before following Lucas into the forest to help him. When they arrive, he has found all of them except Woolly, who has fallen into a deep hole. Lucas and the boys work together to save him, and just in time for the pageant.

At the pageant, after the children sing their song, "The First White Christmas", it begins to snow. Louisa excitedly explains this to Lucas, who is so happy that he cries. Miraculously, Sister Theresa explains, these tears restored his sight, "not just for the moment, but for good".

After the pageant, a small party is held, where Lucas gives Sister Theresa his sheep and Waggles. She is flattered but explains to him that she wouldn't be fit to care for them and invites him to permanently stay at the abbey to watch over them instead of going to the orphanage and so Sister Theresa can raise him herself as if he was her own son. Even Father Thomas agrees, saying, "I do feel that the best place for a boy with no parents is with people who love him." Lucas is thrilled and remarks that this Christmas has been the "first real, happy Christmas of [his] life".

Cast
 Angela Lansbury as Sister Theresa
 Cyril Ritchard as Father Thomas
 David Kelley as Lucas
 Dina Lynn as Louisa
 Iris Rainer as Sister Catherine
 Joan Gardener as Sister Jean

Additional cast
 Greg Thomas - Trickster Boy #1
 Don Messick - Waggles
 Sean Manning - Trickster Boy #2
 Hilary Momberger as Octavia
 Dru Stevens - Trickster Boy #3
 The Wee Winter Singers as the Children Chorus

Songs
 Christmas Snow is Magic/Save a Little Christmas (opening version) – Children Chorus
 Save a Little Christmas – Father Thomas, Sister Theresa, Children Chorus
 Christmas Snow is Magic – Sister Theresa
 White Christmas – Lucas, Sister Theresa
 The First White Christmas – Children Chorus
 The First White Christmas (closing version) – Children Chorus

Crew
 Produced and Directed by Arthur Rankin, Jr. and Jules Bass
 Written by Julian P. Gardner
 Music and Lyrics by Maury Laws and Jules Bass
 Sound: John Curcio, Don Hahn, Dave Iveland, Tom Clack
 Post Production Editing: Irwin Goldress
 "Animagic" Production Supervisors: Akikazu Kono and Ichiro Komuro
 Design: Lester Abrams
 Music Arranged and Conducted by Maury Laws

Notes
The film's title actually refers to the Christmas pageant the orphan children presented on Christmas Eve, though the title could also refer to the first time Lucas actually experiences snow after his sight returns.

It originally premiered on December 19, 1975 on NBC. In later years, it aired on CBS, usually as the last Rankin/Bass special aired for the season. Freeform once aired the special each year during its "25 Days of Christmas" programming block, but AMC has now taken over broadcast rights for the special as of 2018.  A VHS version is also available from ABC Video Enterprises in 1987, and Warner Home Video on October 3, 1990 in the Holiday Treasures line.

It was also released on DVD on October 2, 2012. Warner Home Video repackaged the DVD release of the special along with three of other Rankin/Bass Christmas DVDs in the 4 Kid Favorites: Merry Masterpieces box set, released on October 13, 2015.

The story is set in 1845, yet Lukas and Sister Theresa sing "White Christmas," which wouldn't be written until nearly 100 years later.

The nuns' black outfits indicate they're Carmelites, the order that St. Therese De Lesieux, The Little Flower, joined.

See also
 List of American films of 1975
 List of Christmas films

References

External links
 

1970s American animated films
1970s American television specials
1970s animated television specials
1970s animated short films
1975 animated films
1975 films
1975 in American television
1975 television specials
American animated short films
American television films
Christmas television specials
Films scored by Maury Laws
Television shows directed by Arthur Rankin Jr.
Television shows directed by Jules Bass
NBC television specials
Rankin/Bass Productions television specials
Stop-motion animated television shows
Stop-motion animated short films
American Christmas television specials
1970s English-language films